Londrina Esporte Clube, more commonly referred to as Londrina, is a Brazilian professional association football club in Londrina, Paraná which currently plays in Série B, the second tier of Brazilian football, after being promoted from Série C in 2020. They also play in the Campeonato Paranaense, the top division of the Paraná state football league.

The club was founded on April 5, 1956 and originally played at the Vitorino Gonçalves Dias stadium. Their current stadium, the Estádio do Café was built for Londrina's participation in the 1976 Brazilian league championship.

The most successful period for Londrina came between 1976 and 1982 when Londrina competed in Brazil's top league for 6 seasons. They were relegated for the 1980 season but claimed their only national league title by becoming champions of the second division. They have also won the state championship four times, as well as claiming 12 Campeonato do Interior Paranaense titles.

In 2013, Londrina finished in top place in the general classification of the Campeonato Paranaense. Although they did not qualify for the state championship final they won the Interior final and thereby qualified for a place in the Campeonato Brasileiro Série D, the fourth tier of the Brazilian league system and will also be placed in the draw for the First Round of the Copa do Brasil.

History
Londrina was founded by a group of sportsmen who, after watching a friendly match between Nacional and Vasco da Gama in Rolândia, decided that they did not want to go to Rolândia to watch football. Instead, they founded a club in Londrina, their own city. The club, named Londrina Futebol e Regatas, was founded on April 5, 1956. They chose blue and white to be Londrina's colors.

In 1969, Londrina Futebol e Regatas merged with Paraná Esporte Clube, founded in 1942, forming Londrina Esporte Clube. Red and white, the colors for the city of Londrina, became the new club's colors. In 1972, Carlos Antônio Franchello returned to the presidency of the club, and restored blue and white as the club's colors.

In 2008, Londrina won the Copa Paraná for the first time, after beating Cianorte in the final. The club also competed in the same season's Recopa Sul-Brasileira. Londrina was eliminated in the Recopa Sul-Brasileira in the semifinals after a penalty shootout by Brusque.

Honours
 Campeonato Brasileiro Série B
Winners (1): 1980

 Primeira Liga
Winners (1): 2017

 Campeonato Paranaense
Winners (5): 1962, 1981, 1992, 2014, 2021

 Copa Paraná
Winners (1): 2008

 Campeonato Paranaense Second Division
Winners (3): 1997, 1999, 2011

Campeonato Brasileiro Série A participations
The club competed in the Campeonato Brasileiro Série A in 1976, 1977, 1978, 1979, 1981, 1982, and in 1986. Londrina's best campaign was in 1977, when the club finished in the fourth place.

Stadium

Londrina's stadium is Estádio do Café, inaugurated in 1976, with a maximum capacity of 36,000 people. However, Vitorino Gonçalves Dias stadium, with a maximum capacity of 10,000 people is owned by Londrina, and sometimes is also used by the club.

Players

First team squad

References

External links

 Londrina Esporte Clube's official Website

Londrina Esporte Clube
Association football clubs established in 1956
Football clubs in Paraná (state)
1956 establishments in Brazil